Parva may refer to:

 PARVA, a gene
 The 18 parvas, books or chapters of the Mahabharata
 Parva (band), name of English band Kaiser Chiefs from 2000 to 2003
 Parva (2002 film), a Kannada language film by Sunil Kumar Desai
 Parva (2017 film), a Nepali film
 Parva (food), a class of Colombian baked goods
 Parva (novel), a 1979 novel by S.L Bhyrappa
 Parva, a crustacean larval form, found in shrimp
 La Parva, a town and ski resort near Santiago, Chile
 Parva, Bistrița-Năsăud, a commune in Bistriţa-Năsăud County, Romania

Place names in England
There are several locations where one settlement is named "Magna" and another nearby "Parva". In this context, magna and parva are the Latin terms for "great" and "little" respectively. Examples include Appleby Magna and Appleby Parva in Leicestershire, Ash Magna and Ash Parva in Shropshire, and Dalton Magna and Dalton Parva in South Yorkshire.

See also
 
 Pareve, sometimes pronounced parva, classification of food in the laws of kashrut